Kuttin Loose is the third EP released by Kutt Calhoun, an American rapper. Kuttin Loose was released on  through Calhoun's imprint Black Gold Entertainment. It peaked at No. 16 on the Heatseekers Albums chart, and No. 41 on the Top Rap Albums chart. HipHopDX gave Kuttin Loose a score of 3.5/5 and a positive review. Wrote MetroActive, "on his latest effort, the Kuttin Loose EP, he demonstrates a devastating flow, razor sharp wit and some downright nasty Dirty South production." A single from the album, "Handz Up (Shut Shit Down)" addressed police brutality, with Kutt directing the music video himself.

Track listing

Charts

Personnel

Kutt Calhoun - primary artist

References 

2015 EPs
Kutt Calhoun albums